Soft tennis was contested as a demonstration sport at the 1990 Asian Games. The competition took place from 24 to 30 September 1990. All events were held at the Beijing International Tennis Center in Beijing, China.

Japan topped the medal table winning two gold medals.

Medalists

Medal table

Results

Men's team

Preliminary round

Group A

Group B

Knockout round

Women's team

Preliminary round

Group A

Group B

Knockout round

References 

Results

External links 
 Soft Tennis at the Asian Games – Men's doubles
 Soft Tennis at the Asian Games – Women's doubles

1990 Asian Games events
1990
Asian Games
1990 Asian Games